Beckenham Rugby Football Club is in Beckenham in South East London. The club was founded in 1894.

The men's first XV currently compete in newly created Regional 2 South East - a league at the sixth tier of the English rugby union system - after gaining promotion as winners of the London 2 South East at the end of the 2021/22 season.

The Ladies first XV currently compete in the Women's Championship South 1 - a league at the second tier of the Women's English rugby union system after winning their league and promotion in the 2021/22 season.  The Ladies 2nd XV will compete in the Women's Challenge 2 South East (Central) league for the 2022/23 season.

The club also has a thriving mini and youth section with teams for boys and girls from age 3 to our U18 academy sides with over 700 young players on our books.

Some of our most recent success stories include Elliot Daly who started his rugby journey with Beckenham RFC, while Academy coach Phil Davies and Beckenham player Lamarr Sinclair took charge of Jamaica RFU U19s in the 2022 Americas North U19 Championship held in Jamaica.  A number of Beckenham players were called up with Ben Hatfield being awarded "Most Valuable Player" by the USA Head Coach in the final.

Honours 
Men
London 2 South East winners (2): 1995/96, 2018/19
Kent Plate winners (3): 2006, 2007, 2010

Ladies
Women's Championship South East 2 winners: 2021/22

External links 
Beckenham RFC website
England Rugby: Elliot Daly - Rising Son

English rugby union teams
Rugby union in Kent
Rugby clubs established in 1894
1894 establishments in England
Sport in the London Borough of Bromley